The Carmel Head Thrust is a geological fault on Carmel Head in north Anglesey, Wales, where rocks of the Precambrian Mona Complex are thrust over Lower Paleozoic sedimentary rocks.

See also
List of geological faults of Wales

References

Geology of Wales
Cylch-y-Garn